The Main Line is a railway line in South East Queensland, Australia. It was opened in a series of sections between 1865 and 1867. It commences at Roma St Station in Brisbane and extends west 161 km to Toowoomba. It is the first narrow gauge main line constructed in the world. The section of the line from the end of Murphys Creek railway station to the Ruthven Street overbridge, Harlaxton is listed on the Queensland Heritage Register. The Murphys Creek Railway Complex, the Lockyer Creek Railway Bridge (Lockyer), the Lockyer Creek Railway Bridge (Murphys Creek) and Swansons Rail Bridge are also heritage listed.

History

Queensland Railways (QR) was the first operator in the world to adopt narrow gauge (in this case ) for a main line, and this remains the system wide gauge within Queensland today.

The colony of Queensland separated from New South Wales in 1859, and the new government was keen to facilitate development and immigration. Improved transport to the fertile Darling Downs region situated west of Toowoomba was seen as a priority. As adequate river transport was already established between the capital Brisbane and the then separate settlement of Ipswich, the railway commenced from the latter locality and the initial section, built over relatively flat, easy country opened to Bigge's Camp, at the eastern base of the Little Liverpool Range, on 31 July 1865. Called the Main Line, the only significant engineering work was the bridge over the Bremer River to North Ipswich.

The adoption of narrow gauge was controversial at the time, and was largely predicated by the government's desire for the fastest possible construction timeframe at least cost. This resulted in adoption of sharper curves and a lower axle load than was considered possible using standard gauge, and an assessment at the time put the cost of a narrow gauge line from Ipswich to Toowoomba as 25% of the cost of a standard gauge line. In a colony with a population of ~30,000 when the decision was made, it is understandable.

First tunnels

Beyond Grandchester, the line was built with curves of  radius and uncompensated grades of 1 in 50 (2%), giving an effective grade of 1 in 41 (~2.5%) on  radius curves.
 
From the western portal of the Victoria tunnel the line descends at 1 in 50 to Laidley and then over relatively flat (1 in 100 maximum grades) easy country to Gatton (opened 1 June 1866) and Helidon (opened 30 July 1866). This  section was duplicated in 1913–14, with the section from Laidley to Yarongmulu (just west of the Victoria Tunnel) being built to 1 in 60 for Brisbane bound trains.

Surmounting the main range

From Helidon the line climbs  in  up the Main Range to the summit at Harlaxton [ above sea level (asl)] at an average grade of 1 in 70. This section was opened on 30 April 1867.

Comment on the design

It states that:

It goes on to comment on the Main Range section that:

In 2013 QR called tenders for the lowering of the 11 tunnel floors to enable  ISO containers to be carried when the work is completed, expected to be by 2015.

East to the Capital

The early realisation by the Queensland government of the advantages of rail transport over river transport resulted in the line being extended east and opened from Ipswich to Sherwood on 5 October 1874, Oxley Point (now Chelmer) on 4 February 1875 and on to Roma Street Station [situated beside the street named after the wife of the first Queensland Governor, Lady Diamantina Bowen (née di Roma), who also had the town of Roma, 511 km west of Roma St (which is the 0 km post on the QR system) on the western line named after her] on 7 July 1876 with the completion of the Albert Bridge over the Brisbane River between Oxley Point and Indooroopilly. As part of that project the line west of Ipswich was realigned with a new bridge over the Bremer River at Wulkuraka opening on 26 April 1875. Part of the original line remains to access the North Ipswich Railway Workshops Museum.

Originally built as single track, the Roma St - Ipswich section was duplicated from 1885 to 1887, indicating how quickly the traffic volume grew on the line. The Albert Bridge was built to accommodate two tracks in 1876, though only one was laid at the time.

The line west of Ipswich was duplicated to Wulkuraka in 1902, to Grandchester in 1913 and from Yarongmalu (western end of the Victoria Tunnel) to Helidon in 1918.

The section from Roma St to Corinda (11 km) was quadruplicated in 1963, and extended to Darra (a further 5 km) in 2011, which became the junction for the first section of the new Springfield line at that time.

Current line standards
The Main Line is currently laid with  rail between Roma St and Ipswich,  rail west of there.

The section between Wulkuraka and Rosewood features bi-directional signalling.

Electrification

The Main Line between Roma St and Darra was the first section of railway electrified in Queensland, commencing service in 1979. Electrification has subsequently been extended to Rosewood, the limit of Brisbane urban rail services.

Branch lines

A series of branch lines were built to connect to the Main Line, and these are listed from east to west below.

 Corinda–Yeerongpilly line (3.9 km) opened on 2 June 1884 as part of the line built to connect the Main Line to the South Brisbane river wharves at Stanley St. This line now connects the Main Line to the Beenleigh line (including the major freight yard at Acacia Ridge) and the Cleveland line, including the line to the main Brisbane seaport at Fisherman Islands.
 Darra–Springfield a new passenger only line opened on 2 December 2013.
 Redbank–Bundamba loop completed 1904, this line serviced a number of small coal mines, and the remaining Bundamba–Swanbank section services a power station.
 Tivoli/Mt Crosby A line was built from North Ipswich 4 km to serve a coal mine at Tivoli, opened 23 March 1898. In 1912 the line was extended 7 km to Mt Crosby adjacent to the Brisbane River to facilitate construction of a weir and water treatment plant, and then supply coal. The Mt Crosby section closed in 1932, with the remainder closing in 1965.
 Dugandan and Mt Edwards (Fassifern Valley lines) The first branch line in Queensland was from near Ipswich (Fassifern Junction) to Harrisville, opened 10 July 1882, and the line was subsequently extended to service a sawmill at Dugandan, just south of Boonah in September 1887. A branch from Kalbar to Mt Edwards opened in October 1922, proposed to be extended to join the Warwick–Maryvale line to provide a direct line to Warwick, known as the 'Via Recta'. That would have involved another crossing of the Main Range through Spicer's Gap, involving a spiral loop with uncompensated 1 in 33 grades and 100m radius curves, giving a ruling grade equivalent of 1 in 27. From 1888 until 1930 the Brisbane–Sydney railway connection was via Toowoomba, Warwick and Stanthorpe (the Southern line) with a change of gauge at Wallangarra on the NSW border. The Via Recta proposal was intended to bypass Toowoomba, but would have involved very significant construction costs. Once it was agreed to extend a standard gauge line from Casino and Kyogle in NSW to South Brisbane (opened 1930), the rationale for the Via Recta disappeared. Both lines closed in 1964, though the 5 km section from Ipswich to Churchill was retained until 1994 to serve several goods sidings.
 Brisbane Valley railway line from Wulkuraka to Yarraman. Opened between 1886 and 1913, 161 km, closed between 1988 and 1993. A proposed extension to connect to Nanango, terminus of the branch line from Theebine Junction was never constructed.
 Yarrowlea–Ebenezer railway line opened on 1 February 1990, 5.4 km, serves a coal mine that ships export coal via the Port of Brisbane.
 Rosewood–Marburg opened 18 December 1911, 14 km, closed in sections between 1964 and 1995.
 Laidley–Mulgowie opened 19 April 1911, 11 km, closed 23 January 1955.

See also

Rail transport in Queensland
Travelling post office, Queensland

References

External links
 1925 map of the Queensland railway system

 
Railway lines in Queensland
Railway lines opened in 1865
South East Queensland
1865 establishments in Australia